Lee-Song Hee-il (born 1971) is a South Korean film director whose first feature film No Regret is regarded as "the first real Korean gay feature." The film won him Best Independent Film Director at the 2006 Director's Cut Awards. Lee-Song is openly gay.

Filmography 
 Sugar Hill (2000)
 Good Romance (2001)
 Four Letter Words (2002)
 Say That You Want To Fuck With Me (2003)
 Camellia Project (2004)
 No Regret (2006)
 Break Away (2010)
 Going South (2012)
 Suddenly, Last Summer (2012)
 White Night (2012)
 Night Flight (2014)
 Swallow (2022)

References

External links 
 
 
 

1971 births
Living people
LGBT film directors
People from Iksan
South Korean gay men
South Korean film directors
Jeonbuk National University alumni